Robert Braithwaite Martineau (19 January 1826 – 13 February 1869) was an English painter.

Life
Martineau was the son of Elizabeth Batty and Philip Martineau, a Master in Chancery. Through his mother, he was the grandson of Robert Batty, M.D. (1763–1849), physician and amateur painter.

Martineau attended Colfes school for a few years at the age of 15. He first trained as a lawyer and later entered the Royal Academy where he was awarded a silver medal. He studied under Pre-Raphaelite artist William Holman Hunt and once shared a studio with him. He died at the age of 43.  In 1865, he married Maria Wheeler and had two children with her.

His most famous painting, The Last Day in the Old Home, portrays the household of a feckless squire after gambling away his family's inheritance. The man portrayed is Colonel John Leslie Toke (1839–1911) who was a friend of Martineau and was painted at his country home, Godinton House in Ashford, Kent. In an odd way life came to imitate art, for J L Toke inherited the house in 1866 but lost it after four hundred years of the Toke family living there. The painting can be seen at the Tate Gallery in London. Other paintings were bequeathed to the Ashmolean Museum in Oxford and Liverpool Art Gallery by his daughter Helen. Other less well known paintings include Kit's First Writing Lesson and Picciola.

Martineau was buried in Kensal Green Cemetery.

Works
 Picciola, Tate, 1853.
 The Spelling Lesson, Paris, Musée d'Orsay, circa 1856.

Notes

References

Bibliography
 Christoph Newall, La Leçon d'orthographe, La Revue du Musée d'Orsay, n° 21 autommne 2005, p. 20-25.

External links

1826 births
1869 deaths
19th-century English painters
English male painters
Alumni of the Royal Academy Schools
Artists' Rifles soldiers
Pre-Raphaelite painters
19th-century English male artists